Ceol Cheann Dubhrann is an album supporting Scoil Naisiúnta Rann na Feirste, a National school and Áislann Rann na Feirste, a community centre in Ranafast in the Gaeltacht of County Donegal, Ireland. The album was recorded, mixed, produced and engineered by Mánus Lunny and mastered by Paul McGeechan at Park Lane in Glasgow and features notable singers such as Máire Ní Bhraonáin (Moya Brennan) and Mairéad Ní Mhaonaigh.

Background
Coiste Cheol Cheann Dubhrann (Music of Ceann Dubhrann Committee - based in Ranafast) began working on the project when building work on Áislann Rann na Feirste was nearing completion to raise funds for the aforementioned initiative and the National school in the area. The album mostly features local singers and musicians from the area, along with three musicians whose parents are from the area and two singers from Gaoth Dobhair (Gweedore); Máire Ní Bhraonáin (Moya Brennan) and Mairéad Ní Mhaonaigh. Most songs are also from the area with a few that have been popular over the centuries in the area, from other parts of Ulster. The album was launched on 12 December 2009 in Leo's Tavern, Mín a' Leice, Donegal. A further launch took place in Belfast's Cultúrlann McAdam Ó Fiaich on 26 February 2010.

A free copy of the album was given to every household in Ranafast. The album also features the four surviving singers of the 1970s Gael Linn album, Rann na Feirste.

Track listing

Personnel

Singers
 Máire Ní Bhraonáin
 Mairéad Ní Mhaonaigh
 Maighread Ní Dhomhnaill
 Tríona Ní Dhomhnaill
 Gearóidín Breathnach
 Dónall Mac Ruairí
 Connie Mhary Mhicí Ó Gallchóir
 Bernard Ó Duibheannaigh
 Aodh Óg Ó Duibheannaigh
 Aodh Mac Ruairí
 Néidí Mhary Hughie Ó Gallchóir
 Tony Mac Ruairí
 Rosanna Ní Dhónaill
 John Mhary Mhicí Ó Gallchóir
 Seán Mac Ruairí
 Sean Ó Duibheannaigh
 Charlie Ghracie 'ac Grianna
 Sailí Bn. Uí Ghallchóir
 Pól Ó Gallchóir

Musicians
 Mánus Lunny
 Dónal Lunny
 Seosamh Mac Grianna
 Seosamh Óg Mac Grianna

Production
 Recording & Mixing: Mánus Lunny
 Engineering: Mánus Lunny
 Mastering: Paul McGeechan
 Artwork: Édaín O'Donnell
 Photographs: Donnchadh Ó Baoill, Donnchadh Mac Garbheith, Vincie Shíle Ó Domhnaill
 Coiste Cheol Cheann Dubhrann: Donnchadh Ó Baoill, Pádraig Ó Baoighill, Mánus Lunny, Tony Mac Ruairí

References

 New CD celebrated Rann na Feirste, Donegal Democrat
 Ceol Cheann Dubhrann press release, Cló Iar-Chonnachta
 Moya Brennan on the Songs of Rann na Feirste
 Samples of 'Ceol Cheann Dubhrann'

Notes

External links 
 Áislann Rann na Feirste
 Cló Iar-Chonnachta

2009 albums
Charity albums
Folk albums by Irish artists
Irish-language albums